is an idiom commonly used in East Asian cultures such as Japan, Korea, China, which denotes a form of interpersonal communication through unspoken mutual understanding. This four-character compound's (or ) kanji (Chinese characters) literally translates as "like minds, (are) communicating minds". Sometimes translated into English as "telepathy" or "sympathy",  (in Korean) is also commonly rendered as "heart-to-heart communication" or "tacit understanding".

Silent understanding is  recognized as a universal human phenomenon; however, some Japanese believe it to be a unique characteristic of Japanese culture. Whereas the Japanese concept of  denotes a deliberate form of nonverbal communication,  refers to a passive form of shared understanding.  is traditionally perceived by the Japanese as sincere, silent communication via the heart or belly (i.e. symbolically from the inside), as distinct from overt communication via the face and mouth (the outside), which is seen as being more susceptible to insincerities. The introduction of this concept to Japan (via China) is related to the traditions of Zen Buddhism, where the term  refers to direct mind transmission.

, or non-verbal communication, continues to influence aspects of contemporary Japanese culture and ethics, ranging from business practices to end-of-life care.

See also
Exformation
Ingroups and outgroups

References

Japanese values
Japanese words and phrases